Neopalame cretata is a species of beetle in the family Cerambycidae. It was described by Monné and Delfino in 1980.

References

Acanthocinini
Beetles described in 1980